The Hundred of Hay is a hundred within the County of Eyre, South Australia. The main town of the hundred is McBean Pound.

References

Limestone Coast
Hay